Sjoerd Wartena (born 1 May 1939) is a retired Dutch rower. He competed at the 1964 Summer Olympics in the coxless fours, together with Jim Enters, Herman Boelen and Sipke Castelein, and finished in fourth place. He won a silver medal in the coxed pairs at the 1963 European Championships.

Son of a doctor, Wartena studied literature and worked at a university library in Amsterdam. In the 1970s he moved to a village in southern France, where he learned farming and in 2003 founded the movement Terre de Liens devoted to ecologically friendly agriculture.

References

1939 births
Living people
Dutch male rowers
Olympic rowers of the Netherlands
Rowers at the 1964 Summer Olympics
Rowers from Amsterdam
European Rowing Championships medalists
20th-century Dutch people